XHWQ-FM is a radio station on 103.1 FM in Monclova, Coahuila, Mexico. It is known as WQ La Súper Estación.

History
XEWQ-AM 1330 received its concession on August 6, 1958. It was owned by José Boone Menchaca and broadcast for many years with 1,000 watts day and 250 watts night. In the 1990s, it raised its daytime power to 4,000 watts. In October 2011, XEWQ was cleared for AM-FM migration.

References

Radio stations in Coahuila